Fuori uno sotto un altro... arriva il passatore (internationally released as Holy God, Here Comes the Passatore!, God Help Us, Here Comes the Passatore! and Holy God, It's the Passatore) is a 1973 Italian adventure-comedy film directed by Giuliano Carnimeo.

It is loosely based on the real-life events of Stefano Pelloni  (1824-1851), an Italian highwayman known as "Il Passatore".

Plot

Cast 
George Hilton as Stefano Pelloni, il Passatore
Edwige Fenech as Mora
Manuel Zarzo as Casimiro Casadei   (credited as Manolo Zardo)
Umberto D'Orsi as the Cardinal
Sal Borgese as  Mangiabisce
Lucrezia Love as Countess Amalia Casadei 
Jack Logan as Mattiazzo 
Helga Liné as Zaira
Chris Huerta as Domandone
Chris Avram as Zambelli
Dante Maggio as the robbed priest

See also 
 Bullet for Stefano (1947)
 List of Italian films of 1973

References

External links

Holy God, Here Comes the Passatore at Variety Distribution

1973 films
Films directed by Giuliano Carnimeo
Biographical films about Italian bandits
Spaghetti Western films
1973 Western (genre) films
1970s Italian films